Persatuan Sepakbola Galela (simply known as Persega Galela) is an Indonesian football club based in Galela, North Halmahera Regency, North Maluku. They currently compete in the Liga 3.

References

Football clubs in Indonesia
Football clubs in North Maluku
Association football clubs established in 1980
1980 establishments in Indonesia